June 11 - Eastern Orthodox Church calendar - June 13

All fixed commemorations below celebrated on June 25 by Orthodox Churches on the Old Calendar.

For June 12th, Orthodox Churches on the Old Calendar commemorate the Saints listed on May 29.

Saints
 Virgin-martyr Antonina, of Nicaea in Bithynia (c. 286-305)  (see also: March 1)
 Saints Basilides, Cyrinus, Nabor and Nazarius, and those with them, soldiers, at Rome (304)
 Saint Amphianus, Bishop and Confessor, in Cilicia (c. 310)
 Saint Triphyllius, Bishop of Leucosia (Nicosia), in Cyprus (370)
 Saint Zenon, Bishop of Kyrenia in Cyprus.
 Saint Olympius, Bishop and Confessor, in Thrace (4th century)
 Saint Timothy the Hermit, of Egypt (4th century)
 Saints John, Andrew, Heraclemon, and Theophilus, hermits of Egypt (4th century)  (see also: December 2)
 Venerable Onuphrius the Great (4th century)
 Saint John the Soldier, of Egypt (6th-7th century)
 Venerable Peter of Mount Athos (734)
 Venerable Julian of Dagaz (Dogazou), of the Dagouta Church in Constantinople.
 Saint John (Tornicus) of Mt. Athos and Georgia (998)

Pre-Schism Western saints
 Virgin-martyr Cunera of Rhenen, Netherlands (451)
 Saint Ternan, an early missionary bishop among the Picts in Scotland (5th century)
 Saint Leo III, Pope of Rome, who refused to add the filioque to the Nicene Creed (816)
 Saint Odulphus (Odulph), Confessor and Priest (c. 855)
 Saint Gerebald, Bishop of Châlons-sur-Seine in France (885)

Post-Schism Orthodox saints
 New Martyr John of Trebizond, who contested in Akkerman (Asprokastron, Bilhorod-Dnistrovskyi) (1330 or 1492)
 Venerable Arsenius of Konevits, founder of Konevits Monastery, Wonderworker (1447)
 Venerable Onuphrius of Malsk, founder of Malsk Monastery in Pskov, Wonderworker (1492)
 Saints Onuphrius and Auxentius, monks, of Vologda (15th-16th century)
 Venerable Stephen of Komel, founder of Ozersk Monastery in Vologda (1542)
 Saints Jonah and Bassian, monks of Pertomsk in Solovki (1561)
 Saint Onuphrius of Katrom Monastery, founder of Katrom Monastery in Vologda (16th century)
 Venerable Serapion the Wonderworker, of Izborsk, Igumen (16th century)
 Saint Onuphrius the Fool-for-Christ, of Romanov-Borisoglebsk.
 Venerable Onuphrios of Preveza, of the Monastery of the Birth of the Theotokos, in Coronisia in Arta, Greece (18th century)
 Hieromartyr Benedict of Serres and Thessaloniki, priest, by beheading, and other monk-martyrs with him (1821):
 Monk-martyr Paul of Ioannina and Thessaloniki (c. 1821)
 Monk-martyr Synesios of Thessaloniki (1821)
 Monk-martyr Timotheos of Veria and Thessaloniki (1822)

New martyrs and confessors
 New Martyrs Onuphrius, Bishop (1938), and those with him: 
 Anthony, Barsanuphius and Joseph (1937), and Bishop Alexander Kharkovsky.

Other commemorations
 Synaxis of Venerable Alypius the Stylite of Adrianopolis, in Constantinople.
 First (1650) and second (1909) glorifications of St. Anna of Kashin (1368), princess of Kashin (Euphrosyne in monasticism).
 Uncovering of the relics (1672) of St. John of Moscow, Fool-for-Christ (1589)
 Synaxis of the Saints of the St. Onuphrius Monastery at Jabłeczna in Poland.
 Miracle-working icons of the Theotokos and St. Onuphrius, at St. Onuphrius Monastery in Poland (14th century)
 Repose of Elder Peter of Katounakia, Mt. Athos (1867)
 Repose of Blessed Hermit Philaretus of Mt. Athos (1961)

Icon gallery

Notes

References

Sources
 June 12/25. Orthodox Calendar (PRAVOSLAVIE.RU).
 June 25 / June 12. HOLY TRINITY RUSSIAN ORTHODOX CHURCH (A parish of the Patriarchate of Moscow).
 June 12. OCA - The Lives of the Saints.
 The Autonomous Orthodox Metropolia of Western Europe and the Americas (ROCOR). St. Hilarion Calendar of Saints for the year of our Lord 2004. St. Hilarion Press (Austin, TX). p. 43.
 The Twelfth Day of the Month of June. Orthodoxy in China.
 June 12. Latin Saints of the Orthodox Patriarchate of Rome.
 The Roman Martyrology. Transl. by the Archbishop of Baltimore. Last Edition, According to the Copy Printed at Rome in 1914. Revised Edition, with the Imprimatur of His Eminence Cardinal Gibbons. Baltimore: John Murphy Company, 1916. p. 171.
 Rev. Richard Stanton. A Menology of England and Wales, or, Brief Memorials of the Ancient British and English Saints Arranged According to the Calendar, Together with the Martyrs of the 16th and 17th Centuries. London: Burns & Oates, 1892. pp. 265–267.
Greek Sources
 Great Synaxaristes:  12 ΙΟΥΝΙΟΥ. ΜΕΓΑΣ ΣΥΝΑΞΑΡΙΣΤΗΣ.
  Συναξαριστής. 12 Ιουνίου. ECCLESIA.GR. (H ΕΚΚΛΗΣΙΑ ΤΗΣ ΕΛΛΑΔΟΣ). 
  12/06/2017. Ορθόδοξος Συναξαριστής. 
Russian Sources
  25 июня (12 июня). Православная Энциклопедия под редакцией Патриарха Московского и всея Руси Кирилла (электронная версия). (Orthodox Encyclopedia - Pravenc.ru).
  12 июня по старому стилю / 25 июня по новому стилю. Русская Православная Церковь - Православный церковный календарь на 2017 год.
  12 июня (ст.ст.) 25 июня 2014 (нов. ст.). Русская Православная Церковь Отдел внешних церковных связей. (DECR).

June in the Eastern Orthodox calendar